Joseph M. Terrell (1861–1912) was a U.S. Senator from Georgia from  1910 to 1911. Senator Terrell may also refer to:

Alexander W. Terrell (1827–1912), Texas State Senate
John Dabney Terrell Sr. (1775–1850), Alabama State Senate